William K. Klingaman, Sr. (December 14, 1916 – August 13, 1991) was a former Republican member of the Pennsylvania House of Representatives.

References

Republican Party members of the Pennsylvania House of Representatives
1991 deaths
1916 births
People from Tamaqua, Pennsylvania
20th-century American politicians